Anopina triangulana is a moth of the family Tortricidae. It is found in California in the United States.

The length of the forewings is 6.5–8 mm. Adult are pale grey mottled with dark grey. There is a well-defined dark triangle beyond the midcosta. Females have the distal half of the forewings mostly fuscous clouded, obscuring this discal triangle. The basal area is pale ochreous or tan. Adults are on wing from April to November.

References

Moths described in 1908
triangulana
Moths of North America